This is a list of football clubs in Paraguay which are affiliated with the Asociación Paraguaya de Fútbol. As of the 2016 season, clubs are listed in rank of the Paraguayan football league system.

Primera División Paraguaya

 Cerro Porteño (Barrio Obrero)
 Deportivo Capiatá (Capiatá), 2012 runner-up 2° Div.
 General Diaz (Luque), 2012 champion 2° Div.
 Guaraní (Dos Bocas)
 Libertad (Asunción)
 Nacional (Barrio Obrero)
 Olimpia (Asunción)
 Rubio Ñú (Santísima Trinidad)
 Sportivo Luqueño (Luque)
 Sol de América (Villa Elisa)
 River Plate
 General Caballero ZC (Zeballos Cué, Asunción)

Division Intermedia

 Club Atletico 3 de Febrero (Ciudad del Este)
 Deportivo Caacupé (Caacupé) 2012 champion Primera Div. Nacional B
 Cristóbal Colón (Ñemby)
 Deportivo Santaní (San Estanislao)
 Deportivo Caaguazú (Caaguazú)
 Deportivo Liberación
 Independiente F.B.C. (Campo Grande)
 Fernando de la Mora (Fernando de la Mora)
 Fulgencio Yegros (Ñemby)
 Olimpia of Itá
 Liga Ovetense (Coronel Oviedo)
 Resistencia (Ricardo Brugada, Asunción)
 San Lorenzo (San Lorenzo)
 Sport Colombia (Fernando de la Mora)
 Sportivo Iteño (Itá)
 Sportivo Trinidense (Santísima Trinidad, Asunción)

Tercera División Paraguaya

Primera División B Nacional

 Sportivo Carapeguá (Carapeguá)
 Paranaense F.C. (Alto Paraná)
 Cerro Porteño PF (Presidente Franco)
 Sol del Este (Ciudad del Este)
 4 de Octubre (Atyrá)
 22 de Septiembre (Encarnación)
 24 de Junio (San Juan Bautista)
 Choré Central
 Deportivo Beleano
 Juventud Ypanense
 Liga Concepcionera (Concepción)

Primera División B Metropolitana

 12 de Octubre Football Club (Itauguá), 2012 champion Primera B
 Martín Ledesma (Capiatá), 2012 runner-up 3° Div.
 Tacuary (Asunción)
 Sportivo Ameliano (Barrio Jara, Asunción)
 Sportivo Limpeño
 Deportivo Recoleta
 Cerro Corá (Campo Grande, Asunción)
 Colegiales (Asunción)
 Oriental (Ricardo Brugada, Asunción)
 Benjamín Aceval (Villa Hayes), 2012 runner-up 4° Div.
 Capitán Figari (Lambaré)
 29 de Setiembre
 3 de Febrero (Ricardo Brugada, Asunción)
 3 de Noviembre

Cuarta División Paraguaya

Primera División C (Metropolitana)

 Club 1° de Marzo (Fernando de la Mora)
 Atlético Juventud (Loma Pytá, Asunción)
 Atlético Tembetary (Ypané)
 Deportivo Humaitá (Mariano Roque Alonso)
 Deportivo Pinozá (Bernardino Caballero, Asunción)
 Gral. Caballero SF (San Felipe, Asunción)
 Silvio Pettirossi (Republicano, Asunción)
 Pilcomayo F.B.C. (Mariano Roque Alonso)
 Sport Colonial (Sta. Ana, Asunción)
 Valois Rivarola (Zeballos Cué, Asunción)
 Nikkei Bellmare (Itauguá) (disenrolled for one season)
 Club 12 de Octubre SD (Santo Domingo, Asunción)
 Atlántida (Barrio Obrero, Asunción), 2012 champion 4° Div.
 Gral. Caballero CG (Campo Grande, Asunción)
 Presidente Hayes (Tacumbú, Asunción)

Concepción

San Pedro

Cordillera

Guairá

Caaguazú

Caazapá

Itapúa

Misiones

Paraguarí

Alto Paraná

Central

Ñeembucú

Amambay
 América Foot Ball Club
 Club Aquidabán
 Club Atlético Bernardino Caballero  
 Atlético Pedro Juan Caballero  
 Club Deportivo 1º de Marzo 
 General Diaz Foot Ball Club  
 Club Sportivo 2 de Mayo 
 Club Sportivo Obrero  
 Independiente Fútbol Club  
 Mariscal Estigarribia Fútbol Club
 1º de Marzo 
 3 de Noviembre 
 Atletico Amambay 
 Deportivo Obrero 
 Sargento Oliveira 
 Capitán Bado 
 Estrella del Norte 
 13 de junho
 21 de setiembre
 General Eugenio Alejandrino Garay
 Independiente Bella Vista
 Sportivo Obrero
 San Antonio
 Sport Paraguay Fútbol Club

Canindeyú

Presidente Hayes

Alto Paraguay

Boquerón
 Cerro Porteño Fortin Manuel Gondra
 Chaco Central
 Guaraní Lagunita
 Kaaguy Rory
 León Guaraní
 Olimpia Campo Acevalense
 Sport Santa Aurelia
 28 de Setiembre Club 28 de Setiembre
 29 de Setiembre Club 28 de Setiembre
 Atlético Aquidaban
 Atlético Juventud Mariscal José Felix Estigarribia
 Fortin Nanawa
 Atlético 13 Tuyuti
 Santa Teresita
 Nueva Estrella
 Cerro León Filadelfia
 1º de Mayo Filadelfia
 Nativos del Chaco
 Olimpia Filadelfia
 Cerro Porteño Filadelfia
 Guaraní Filadelfia
 Sport Boqueron
 Nacional Filadelfia
 Naciones Unidas
 Loma Plata
 Fundacion de Asunción
 Alianza * Trebol
 3 de Febrero Villa Choferes del Chaco
 Sport Ayoreo
 Cerro America del Sur
 4 de Mayo
 15 de Agosto
 Yalve Sanga
 Rivales
 León Guaraní Cayin ô Clim
 Colonias Unidas
 Heroes del Chaco
 Rubio Ñu Campo Alegre
 Misiones
 3 Colonias
 Pioneros del Chaco
 Club Nacional Campo Largo
 5 de Mayo
 Cerro Porteño Campo Lechuza
 Guaraní Campo Lechuza
 6 de Abril
 Olimpia Neuland
 Santa Cecilia
 Nativos Pioneros de America
 Boqueron Betania
 Carlos Antonio Lopez
 Olimpia Samaria
 Guaraní Galilea
 Mariscal Lopez Tiberia
 Casuarina
 Cerro Corá Abundancia
 Deportivo Campo Nuevo

References

External links
 Paraguayan Football Info
 Paraguayan Football Info (in German)

 
Paraguay
clubs
Football clubs